Viacheslav is a Slavonic masculine given name (also can be transliterated as Vyacheslav or Viatcheslav). Notable people with the name include:

Viacheslav Aliabiev (1934–2009), Ukrainian professional footballer
Viacheslav Belavkin, professor in applied mathematics at the University of Nottingham
Viacheslav Chornovil (1937–1999), Ukrainian politician
Viacheslav Datsik (born 1980), Russian former kickboxer and mixed martial artist
Viacheslav Dinerchtein (born 1976), violist and promoter of novel and overlooked viola repertoire
Viacheslav Dydyshko (born 1949), Belarusian chess Grandmaster (1995)
Viacheslav Fetisov (born 1958), retired professional ice hockey defenseman
Viacheslav Grachev (born 1973), Russian rugby union player
Viacheslav Ivanovski (born 1975), Israeli Olympic weightlifter
Viacheslav I of Kiev (1083–1154), Prince of Smolensk, Turov, Pereyaslavl, Peresopnitsa, Vyshgorod, and Grand Prince of Kiev
Viacheslav Kravtsov (born 1987), Ukrainian basketball player
Viacheslav Lampeev (born 1952), former field hockey player from Tajikistan
Viacheslav Lavrov (born 1958), retired professional ice hockey player who played in the Soviet Hockey League
Viacheslav Platonov (1939–2005), Russian volleyball player and coach
Viacheslav Ragozin (1908–1962), Soviet chess Grandmaster, an International Arbiter of chess, and World Correspondence Chess Champion
Viacheslav Samodurov (born 1974), Principal Dancer at the Royal Ballet, Covent Garden in London
Viacheslav Senchenko (born 1977), professional boxer from Ukraine
Viacheslav Solodukhin (1950–1980), retired professional ice hockey player who played in the Soviet Hockey League
Viacheslav Suprunenko (born 1976), deputy of the Kiev City Council, member of the committee on the budget and the socio-economic development
Viacheslav Tsugba (born 1944), third Prime Minister of the Republic of Abkhazia
Viacheslav V. Nikulin, Russian mathematician
Viacheslav Zagorodniuk (born 1972), former Ukrainian figure skater

See also
Vyacheslav

 
Ukrainian masculine given names